John W. Austin (born August 31, 1944) is a retired American basketball player.

Born in Washington, D.C., Austin played at DeMatha Catholic High School in Hyattsville, Maryland, then collegiately for Boston College, the first African American basketball player in Boston College's history. During a 107–92 victory over Georgetown at the Roberts Center in Chestnut Hill, Massachusetts, on February 21, 1964, Austin made history by scoring 49 points, setting a Boston College single-game record scoring record as well as the record for points scored against Georgetown by an opponent in a single game. Both records still stood as of 2018.

The Boston Celtics selected Austin in the fourth round (38th pick overall) of the 1966 NBA draft. He played for the Baltimore Bullets in the National Basketball Association for four games in 1966 and the New Jersey Americans in the American Basketball Association for 41 games in 1967–1968.

References

External links

1944 births
Living people
All-American college men's basketball players
Baltimore Bullets (1963–1973) players
Basketball players from Washington, D.C.
Boston Celtics draft picks
Boston College Eagles men's basketball players
DeMatha Catholic High School alumni
New Jersey Americans players
Parade High School All-Americans (boys' basketball)
American men's basketball players
Point guards